Waikaia was a parliamentary electorate in the Southland region of New Zealand, from 1871 to 1881, and then from 1887 to 1890.

History
James Benn Bradshaw was the first representative; he retired at the end of the parliamentary term in 1875. Bradshaw was succeeded by Horace Bastings, who was elected on 14 January 1876 and who retired at the end of the parliamentary term in 1879. The resulting  was won by Bastings. The Waikaia electorate was abolished in 1881.

He served until the end of the term in 1890 when the electorate was abolished again.

Election results
The electorate was represented by four Members of Parliament:

Key

Notes

References

Historical electorates of New Zealand
Politics of Southland, New Zealand
1870 establishments in New Zealand
1887 establishments in New Zealand
1881 disestablishments in New Zealand
1890 disestablishments in New Zealand